The 1922–23 Columbia men's ice hockey season was the 22nd season of play for the program.

Season
Columbia started its second season under Tom Howard with a 3-game exhibition against Dartmouth in Lake Placid, New York. Their first official game took place a few weeks later against Amherst. After a win over the Lord Jeffs, Columbia was hoping for a repeat performance against Princeton but instead the Tigers throttled the Lions by a 0–14 score. Coach Howard didn't allow the team to surrender after the embarrassing loss and ran the Lions through hard practices leading up to their next game against Pennsylvania. The work paid off with Columbia paying much more attention to their defensive game in a 2–0 win.

After another few weeks off the Lions travelled to upstate New York for a pair of games. Columbia earned a road split against two teams before heading to West Point to face Army. Despite concerns that the weather may not hold the game took place but the Lions fared poorly, losing the match 1–5.

In late February, however, news came to light that the team had committed several serious infractions. The team had played multiple ineligible players under false names after the Princeton game, a violation of sportsmanship and committee regulations in the eyes of Columbia University administration. Several members were disciplined and the remaining game on the schedule was abandoned.

Despite the scandal, the university was willing to continue to support the team. However, when a distinct lack of ice rinks became apparent the following November, Columbia announced that they were cancelling the season. The administration did say that they would bring the team back after one year if the rink situation had improved to their satisfaction, but the next game for the program wouldn't happen for almost 15 years.

Roster

Standings

Schedule and Results

|-
!colspan=12 style=";" | Regular Season

References

Columbia Lions men's ice hockey seasons
Columbia
Columbia
Columbia
Columbia